Hong Kong Association of Science and Mathematics Education is a society to promote and improve the teaching methodology of the science and mathematics in Hong Kong.  Founded in 1964, current members are secondary school teachers, professors and lecturers in the universities and government officials in education.

External links
  Official website

Education in Hong Kong